Andrey Klyuev (born 13 June 1987, in Lipetsk) is a Russian former professional road cyclist.

Major results

2006
 Tour of South China Sea
1st  Points classification
1st Stages 1 & 5
 3rd Ruota d'Oro
 10th Overall Tour of Hainan
1st Stage 5
2007
 1st  Road race, UEC European Under–23 Road Championships
 1st Boucle de l'Artois
 1st Stage 5 Tour de Normandie
 2nd Paris–Troyes
 3rd Tour du Finistère
 3rd Overall Les 3 Jours de Vaucluse
1st  Points classification
1st Stage 2
 3rd Grand Prix of Moscow
 5th Overall Five Rings of Moscow
 8th Classic Loire Atlantique
2008
 3rd Trofeo Piva
 10th Giro del Belvedere

References

1987 births
Living people
Russian male cyclists
Sportspeople from Lipetsk